The Department of Electrical and Electronic Engineering (EEE) at the University of Manchester was formed at the merger of the Victoria University of Manchester and UMIST in 2005, formed largely from the former UMIST department of the same name. The department has its origins in the Department of Physics and Electrical Engineering in the Manchester Municipal School of Technology. The department was originally known as the School of Electrical and Electronic Engineering following the formation of the University of Manchester, however it was renamed in 2019 following a faculty-wide restructuring.
 
The School currently has 71 academic staff, including 28 Professors.

Notable former  staff include  Frederic Calland Williams and  Tom Kilburn  who  pioneered the first stored-program digital computer, Stephen Butterworth famous for the eponymous filter. Notable alumniinclude the aircraft engineer Beatrice Shilling. Current professors include Danielle George a microwave engineer known for her work in public communication of science.

References

Electrical
Manchester
Engineering universities and colleges in the United Kingdom